Solidox or SolidOx may refer to:
 SolidOx (welding), welding equipment (United States)
 Solidox (toothpaste), toothpaste (Norway)
 SolidOx (breathing apparatus), breathing apparatus (France)